Dicyphoma is a genus of flies in the family Stratiomyidae.

Species
Dicyphoma ryckmani James, 1962
Dicyphoma schaefferi (Coquillett, 1904)

References

Stratiomyidae
Brachycera genera
Diptera of North America